Olli Petteri Kolehmainen (born 31 May 1967 in Mikkeli) is a Finnish former sprint canoeist who competed in the late 1980s and early 1990s. At the 1988 Summer Olympics in Seoul, he was eliminated in the semifinals of both the K-2 500 m and the K-2 1000 m events. Four years later in Barcelona, Kolehmainen was eliminated in the semifinals of the K-2 500 m event.

References

External links
 Sports-Reference.com profile

1967 births
Living people
People from Mikkeli
Canoeists at the 1988 Summer Olympics
Canoeists at the 1992 Summer Olympics
Finnish male canoeists
Olympic canoeists of Finland
Sportspeople from South Savo